Agawam is a city in Hampden County, Massachusetts, United States. The population was 28,692 at the 2020 census. Agawam sits on the western side of the Connecticut River, directly across from Springfield, Massachusetts. It is considered part of the Springfield Metropolitan Statistical Area, which is contiguous with the Knowledge Corridor area, the 2nd largest metropolitan area in New England. Agawam contains a subsection, Feeding Hills.  The Six Flags New England amusement park is located in Agawam, on the banks of the Connecticut River.

Agawam's ZIP code, 01001, is the lowest in the contiguous United States.

Etymology
The Native American village originally sited on the west bank of the Connecticut River was known as Agawam, or Agawanus, Aggawom, Agawom, Onkowam, Igwam, and Auguam. It is variously speculated to mean "unloading place" and "fishcuring place", perhaps in reference to fish at Agawam Falls being unloaded from canoes for curing on the flats at the mouth of the Westfield River.

Ipswich, Massachusetts, was also known as Agawam during much of the 17th century, after the English name for the Agawam tribe of  Massachusetts, who were indigenous inhabitants of the area.

History 
On May 15, 1636, William Pynchon purchased land on both sides of the  Connecticut River from the local Pocomtuc Indians known as Agawam, which included present-day Springfield, Chicopee, Longmeadow, and West Springfield, Massachusetts. The purchase price for the Agawam portion was 10 coats, 10 hoes, 10 hatchets, 10 knives, and 10 fathoms of wampum. Agawam and West Springfield separated from Springfield to become the parish of West Springfield in 1757;  Agawam and West Springfield split in 1800. Agawam incorporated as a town on May 17, 1855.

In 1771, John Porter moved to Agawam and founded a gin distillery nine years later. After he died, his grandson, Harry, continued to work the business as the H. Porter Distilling Company. The plant was sold in 1917, and during Prohibition, the main products produced in the building were potato chips and cider. After the Volstead Act was repealed, the mill began producing gin again but closed permanently in 1938. The building, on Main Street near River Road, served as Agawam's Department of Public Works garage until it fell into disrepair.

Agawam furnished 172 men who fought in the American Civil War, 22 of whom died in battle or of disease.

The original town hall, built in 1874 at the corner of Main and School Streets, housed the town government divisions as the current one does today, as well as the original town library located in the building's Tower Room. A small school building was located near the premises and held grades one through three. The building was demolished in 1938, and the property is now the site of Benjamin Phelps Elementary School.

The Feeding Hills town hall, built in 1906, was almost identical to the Agawam town hall and was located at the corner of Springfield and South Westfield Streets. The building was demolished in 1950, and the Clifford M. Granger Elementary School opened in 1946 now occupies that land.

May 29, 1930, and June 1, 1931, saw "grand openings" of Bowles Agawam Airport with the latter date including a visit from 100 biplanes of the United States Army Air Corps Eastern Air Arm. A scheduled air service operated out of Bowles for approximately one year, before ending. The airport continued to operate as a civil airport until 1982. A pari-mutuel horse racing track, including grandstand and stables, was built adjacent to Bowles Airport. Seabiscuit won the Springfield Handicap at Agawam in track record time in October 1935. The racetrack operated until pari-mutuel betting was outlawed by referendum in Hampden County in November 1938. The airport also had plans in the early 1960s to become a commercial airport and host airlines for the city of Springfield, but plans were shelved. The airport and racetrack were demolished in the late 1980s and the area is now an industrial park.

Geography

Agawam is located at  (42.071961, –72.644097). The city borders West Springfield, Massachusetts, to the north, Southwick, Massachusetts, to the west, Longmeadow, Massachusetts, to the east, Springfield, Massachusetts, to the northeast, and Suffield, Connecticut, to the south. Westfield, Massachusetts, also borders to the northwest.

The highest point in Agawam is the -tall Provin Mountain, a ridge that, along with the southern part of East Mountain, forms the western boundary of the city. Both are traversed by the Metacomet-Monadnock Trail and are part of the Metacomet Ridge, a mountainous trap rock ridgeline that stretches from Long Island Sound to nearly the Vermont border.

Agawam has a subsection known as Feeding Hills that runs along the border of Southwick and Westfield, Massachusetts, and Suffield, Connecticut. Its border with Agawam was mainly determined by Line Street, and its ZIP code is 01030.

Demographics

As of the census of 2010, there were 28,144 people, 11,260 households, and 7,462 families residing in the city. The racial makeup of the city was 96.71% White, 0.91% African American, 0.17% Native American, 0.98% Asian, 0.01% Pacific Islander, 0.43% from other races, and 0.80% from two or more races. Hispanic or Latino of any race were 1.83% of the population.

There were 11,260 households, out of which 28.9% had children under the age of 18 living with them, 53.4% were married couples living together, 9.8% had a female householder with no husband present, and 33.7% were non-families. 28.0% of all households were made up of individuals, and 11.3% had someone living alone who was 65 years of age or older. The average household size was 2.43 and the average family size was 3.01.

In the city, the population was spread out, with 22.1% under the age of 18, 6.5% from 18 to 24, 29.7% from 25 to 44, 25.1% from 45 to 64, and 16.7% who were 65 years of age or older. The median age was 40 years. For every 100 females, there were 90.5 males. For every 100 females age 18 and over, there were 86.9 males.

The median income for a household in the city was $49,390, and the median income for a family was $59,088. Males had a median income of $40,924 versus $30,428 for females. The per capita income for the city was $22,562. About 4.3% of families and 5.6% of the population were below the poverty line, including 6.7% of those under age 18 and 7.5% of those age 65 or over.

Government

Agawam is one of thirteen Massachusetts municipalities that have applied for, and been granted, city forms of government but wish to retain "The town of" in their official names. Agawam adopted a city form of government effective 1 January 1973 comprising a 15-member city council and a town manager. Since May 1989 a mayor is the elected leader of the city. The current city council consists of eleven members elected at large by the voters and is the legislative branch of the town government.

The current mayor of Agawam is William Sapelli.

On the state level, Agawam is represented in the Massachusetts Senate by John Velis, and in the Massachusetts House of Representatives by Nicholas Boldyga. On the federal level, Agawam is part of Massachusetts's 1st congressional district, represented by Richard Neal; it is represented in the United States Senate by Ed Markey and Elizabeth Warren.

Law enforcement

The Agawam Police Department has about fifty full-time sworn law enforcement officers and about eight support personnel. The department is responsible for law enforcement at the Six Flags New England amusement park and the Feeding Hills district.

On 5 May 2012, an Agawam officer shot a woman in the face when she answered her door. The city settled with her for $20,000.

In early January 2017, the head of the Agawam Police Patrolman's Association was indicted on charges relating to stealing from the group.

In mid-January 2017, three police officers were fired for beating a prisoner. The attack was caught on video which was released to the public. The officers are appealing their termination. Two of the officers returned to work following two years on paid administrative leave.

FBI crime statistics show the city enjoys a lower-than-average crime rate.

Historical commercial operations
1801 – E. Porter Peppermint distillery, later to become the "Agawam Gin" distillery.

1810 – A cotton mill was erected on the site of present-day Six Flags New England.

1812 – Agawam Woolen Mill was established on Elm Street.  After a fire, the building was rebuilt in brick in 1889 and still exists. The Agawam Woolen Company folded in 1949.

Six Flags New England, formerly Riverside Amusement Park, began as a picnic grove as early as 1840. It became a full-fledged amusement park in 1940.  Riverside Park Speedway, a NASCAR racing track, was part of Riverside park from 1948 to 2000. Riverside was sold to Six Flags in 1996.

1952 – Stacy Machine Co, came to a new plant located on Main St, is best known for producing specialized printing presses. Later known as Kidder-Stacy, the plant closed in the 1990s, but the Main St plant still stands.

1953 – WWLP an NBC affiliate television station began operation with studios and transmitting facilities on Provin Mountain in Feeding Hills.

Library
The Agawam Free Public Library was established in 1891. The first libraries were rooms in the Agawam and Feeding Hills town halls and the Mittenague School in North Agawam.  After a 1904 fire destroyed the Mittenague School and all the books in it, Fred P. Halladay donated land and buildings in North Agawam to use as a library.  In 1925, Minerva Porter Davis donated a building in Agawam Center to serve as the library in that section of town, replacing the Agawam Town Hall rooms.
The Feeding Hills branch moved to a building across the street from the Feeding Hills town hall when that structure was removed to make way for Granger school.  In 1978 the libraries were consolidated in a new building adjacent to the High School on Cooper St.

In fiscal year 2008, the city of Agawam spent 1.39% ($923,113) of its budget on its public library—some $32 per person.

Education

 Benjamin J. Phelps Elementary School: (K–4)
 Clifford M. Granger Elementary School: (K–4)
 James Clark Elementary School: (K–4)
 Robinson Park Elementary School: (K–4)
 Roberta G. Doering Middle School: (5–6)
 Agawam Junior High School: (7–8)
 Agawam High School: (9–12)

Points of interest

 The Agawam Historical Association operates the Agawam Historical and Fire House Museum at 35 Elm Street and the historic Thomas Smith House at 251 North West Street in Feeding Hills.
 Anne Sullivan Memorial – marker and statue dedicated to Helen Keller's tutor, born in Feeding Hills. The memorial is on the corner of Springfield and South Westfield Streets. 
The Massachusetts Veteran's Memorial Cemetery is located off Main Street.
 A series of plaques with the names of Agawam citizens who died in the Vietnam War, World War II, World War I, the Revolutionary War, or the Spanish–American War is displayed at Benjamin J. Phelps Elementary School.
 The 110 mile Metacomet-Monadnock Trail (a hiking trail) traverses the ridgeline of Provin Mountain in western Agawam.
 Robinson State Park, a narrow, urban  park, has its entrance on North St.
 Six Flags New England, the largest amusement park in New England, is located in Agawam.

Notable people

 Creighton Abrams, who commanded military operations in Vietnam War
 Carl Beane, voice of the Boston Red Sox
Scott Daniels, Canadian Native hockey player that played in the NHL for Hartford Whalers, Philadelphia Flyers, and New Jersey Devils
Roger LeClerc, football player for the Chicago Bears 
 Mike Martin, basketball head coach, Brown University
Phil McGeoghan, football player for the Denver Broncos, assistant coach Los Angeles Chargers
 Earl Seibert, hockey player, Hockey Hall of Famer, former Springfield Indians coach
Eddie Shore, hockey player, Hockey Hall of Famer, owner of the Springfield Indians 
 Anne Sullivan, tutor of Helen Keller
Tom Wlaschiha, German actor, known for Game of Thrones and Stranger Things

References

External links

 

 
Cities in Massachusetts
Cities in Hampden County, Massachusetts
Massachusetts populated places on the Connecticut River
Populated places established in 1635
Springfield metropolitan area, Massachusetts
1635 establishments in Massachusetts